Guryong station is a railway station in Suncheon, South Korea. It is on the Gyeongjeon Line.

Railway stations in South Jeolla Province